Atlas Sports & Social F.C. was an English association football club based in Sheffield, South Yorkshire.

History
The club was the formed as the works football team of Firth Brown in 1905, although it was named Atlas & Norfolk Works in homage to the name of the two main foundries owned by the company.

The Atlas & Norfolk Works name remained for 58 years, during which time the club won the Sheffield Amateur League title three times and the Hatchard League twice. They also competed in the FA Cup and FA Amateur Cup during this era.

In 1963 the team was renamed as simply Firth Brown, but this name only lasted until 1976, when the name Atlas Sports & Social was used.

In 1982, the Firth Brown company merged with the British Steel Corporation's River Don Works to form Sheffield Forgemasters, and a year later the football teams of the two firms also joined forces. Forgemasters Sports & Social FC remained in the Sheffield & Hallamshire County Senior League until 1991.

Notable former players
Players that played in the Football League before or after playing for Atlas & Norfolk –

 Ernest Blackwell
 Ted Hufton
 Albert Hutchinson
 Ernest Jackson
 Vince Kenny
 Joe North
 Sam Taylor
 Roy Warhurst

Records
Best FA Cup performance: 2nd Qualifying Round, 1921–22
Best FA Amateur Cup performance: 2nd Qualifying Round, 1956–57

References

Defunct football clubs in South Yorkshire
Sheffield Association League
Hatchard League
Sheffield Amateur League
Works association football teams in England